Abilene Trail is a 1951 American Western film directed by Lewis D. Collins and starring Whip Wilson, Noel Neill and Andy Clyde.

Cast
 Whip Wilson as Dave Hill aka The Kansas Kid 
 Andy Clyde as Sagebrush Charlie 
 Tommy Farrell as Ed Dawson 
 Steve Clark as old man Dawson 
 Noel Neill as Mary Dawson 
 Dennis Moore as Brandon 
 Marshall Reed as Jack Slavens 
 Lee Roberts as Red 
 Milburn Morante as Cowhand Chuck 
 Ted Adams as town Sheriff 
 Bill Kennedy as rancher Colter 
 Stanley Price as Sheriff Warner 
 Lyle Talbot as Dr. Martin

References

External links
 

1951 Western (genre) films
American Western (genre) films
American black-and-white films
Films directed by Lewis D. Collins
Films with screenplays by Harry L. Fraser
Monogram Pictures films
1950s English-language films
1950s American films